Love Will Turn You Around is the thirteenth studio album by Kenny Rogers, released in 1982.

The title cut was the debut single and charted well, reaching #1 on the U.S. and Canadian country charts and adult contemporary charts, and #13 on the Hot 100 chart.  The other single, "A Love Song", didn't fare as well, only reaching #47 on the Billboard Hot 100. It was, however, #1 in Canada and #3 on the U.S. Country chart.

The album peaked at #34 on the Billboard 200 charts.  The album has been certified Platinum in both the U.S. and Canada.

Track listing

Personnel 
 Kenny Rogers – lead vocals, backing vocals (3), vocal arrangements, rhythm arrangements 
 Randy McCormick – keyboards (1)
 Joel Scott – Fender Rhodes (2)
 John Hobbs – acoustic piano (3), organ (7), organ solo (7)
 Clarence McDonald – Fender Rhodes (4, 9, 10)
 Billy Preston – organ (4)
 Lincoln Mayorga – acoustic piano (4, 10)
 Randy Goodrum – keyboards (5), rhythm arrangements (5)
 Shane Keister – keyboards (5)
 Eugene Golden – acoustic piano (6)
 Steve Goldstein – acoustic piano (8)
 Billy Joe Walker Jr. – guitar (1), acoustic guitar (2, 9), mandolin (2)
 Fred Tackett – acoustic guitar (2, 4, 10), guitar (3, 9), electric guitar (7)
 Paul Jackson Jr. – electric guitar (4, 6, 7, 9, 10)
 Larry Byrom – guitar (5)
 Jon Goin – guitar (5)
 Randy Dorman – guitar (6)
 Richie Zito – electric guitar (7), guitar solo (7)
 Waddy Wachtel – acoustic guitar (8)
 Josh Leo – electric guitar (8)
 Joe Chemay – bass (1, 7, 9), backing vocals (6, 7)
 Nathan East – bass (2, 4, 10)
 Emory Gordy Jr. – bass (3)
 Jack Williams – bass (5)
 Chuck Jacobs – bass (6)
 Bryan Garofalo – bass (8)
 Paul Leim – percussion (1), drums (2, 3, 7, 9)
 Leon "Ndugu" Chancler – drums (2, 4, 10)
 Kenny Malone – drums (5), percussion (5)
 Bobby Daniels – drums (6)
 Craig Krampf – drums (8)
 Ress Williams – cowbell (7)
 Gary Herbig – flute solo (6)
 Tommy Morgan – harmonica (8)
 Joel Peskin – tenor saxophone (9), tenor sax solo (9)
 Gene Page – rhythm arrangements, string arrangements
 Brent Maher – rhythm arrangements (5)
 Jimmie Haskell – string arrangements
 Larry Cansler – string arrangements
 Mike Post – string arrangements
 Murray Adler – concertmaster
 Sid Sharp – concertmaster
 Kin Vassy – backing vocals (1, 3, 4, 7, 10), guitar (3)
 Terry Williams – backing vocals (1, 3, 4, 6, 7, 10)
 Herb Pedersen – backing vocals (2, 9)
 Joey Scarbury – backing vocals (2, 9)
 Cindy Fee – backing vocals (3, 4, 6, 10)
 Donna McElroy – backing vocals (5)
 Vicki Hampton – backing vocals (5)
 Don Henley – backing vocals (6)
 Kenny Williams – backing vocals (10)

Production 
 Producers – Kenny Rogers (Tracks 1–4, 6, 7, 9 & 10); David Malloy (Track 1); Brent Maher (Track 5); Randy Goodrum (Track 5); Val Garay (Track 8).
 Production Assistant – Brenda Harvey Richie
 Engineers – Bob Bullock, Reggie Dozier, Val Garay, Brent Maher and Al Schmitt.
 Second Engineers – Niko Bolas, Bob Bullock, Larry Ferguson, Tom Fouce and Stephen Schmitt.
 Recorded at Creative Workshop (Nashville, TN); Lion Share Recording Studios and Record One (Los Angeles, CA).
 Mixing – Bob Bullock, Reggie Dozier, Kenny Rogers and Al Schmitt.
 Mixed at Lion Share Recording Studios 
 Mastered by Bernie Grundman at A&M Studios (Hollywood, CA).
 Art Direction – Bill Burks
 Illustration – Richard Amsel
 Photography – Gary Register

Chart performance

References

Kenny Rogers albums
1982 albums
Albums arranged by Gene Page
Albums arranged by Jimmie Haskell
Albums produced by Val Garay
Albums produced by Brent Maher
Albums produced by David Malloy
Liberty Records albums